Emberg is a German language habitational surname. Notable people with the name include:
 Bella Emberg (1937–2018), English comedy actress
 Kelly Emberg (born 1959), American former model

References 

German-language surnames
German toponymic surnames